Daniel Kelly (born May 25, 1992), also known by his stage names Deph Naught and, more recently, Sif, is a Canadian actor and rapper. He rose to prominence for his portrayal of Owen Milligan on the long-running teen drama series Degrassi: The Next Generation, and has since independently released several mixtapes and music videos.

Early life 
Kelly was born and raised in the Clarkson area of Mississauga, Ontario.

Career

Acting 
Kelly was cast as Owen Milligan on the long-running teen drama series Degrassi: The Next Generation in 2010; he starred on the series as a regular from season 10 to 12. After Degrassi, he appeared on Flashpoint.

In 2014, he portrayed Kyle in the tv movie Sorority Surrogate with former Degrassi: The Next Generation cast member Cassie Steele.

In 2015, he portrayed Roman in the second season of the award-winning web series Teenagers.

Music 
Using the stage names Deph Naught, and, more recently, Sif, Kelly has recorded rap music. He released numerous mixtapes and music videos on YouTube. He has collaborated with several prominent rappers, including Royce da 5'9.

References

External links

1992 births
21st-century Canadian male actors
21st-century Canadian rappers
Canadian male rappers
Canadian male television actors
Living people
Male actors from Ontario
Musicians from Mississauga
21st-century Canadian male musicians